Sonny Shackelford (born April 13, 1985) is a former American football wide receiver. He was signed by the San Diego Chargers as an undrafted free agent in 2007. He played college football at Washington.

College career
Shackelford played at the University of Washington.

Professional career

San Diego Chargers
Shackelford signed a free agent contract in May 2007 with the National Football League's San Diego Chargers. He was waived on August 27.

af2
Shackelford spent time with the Spokane Shock and Mahoning Valley Thunder of af2 in early 2009, but did not appear in a game.

California Redwoods
Shackelford was signed by the California Redwoods of the United Football League on August 18, 2009.

References

External links
Just Sports Stats
Washington Huskies bio

1985 births
Living people
Players of American football from Los Angeles
Washington Huskies football players
San Diego Chargers players
Spokane Shock players
Mahoning Valley Thunder players
Sacramento Mountain Lions players